Nicholas K.J. May (born 4 April 1988, in Ottawa) is a retired Canadian motocross racer who raced professionally in the CMRC nationals.

Career 

May started racing in 2002 and collected multiple amateur championships throughout his youth. In his final year as an amateur, May raced on a broken leg to collect enough points to achieve his season goal of winning two Intermediate championships. His goal was reached and he came out with the 2009 MX1 and MX2 Intermediate Motocross Championship.

In 2009 he raced in the Dominican Republic Motocross Nationals to represent Canada where he earned a respectable 4th place finish. Because of his results and his attitude he was chosen as the DMX Factory Rider For A Day. He was given the opportunity to race on a team for his hometown National at the Sand Del Lee Motocross Park. At the end of the 2009 season, he was awarded his MX2 Pro license.

References

Canadian motocross riders
Living people
1988 births
Sportspeople from Ottawa